Tibia curta, common name the Indian tibia, is a species of large sea snail, a marine gastropod mollusk in the family Strombidae, the true conchs. This species occurs in southern India.

Description
Common Size 150 mm, but the size of the shell varies between 120 mm and 185 mm.

Distribution
This marine species occurs from the Persian Gulf to the Bay of Bengal

References

 Liverani V. (2014) The superfamily Stromboidea. Addenda and corrigenda. In: G.T. Poppe, K. Groh & C. Renker (eds), A conchological iconography. pp. 1–54, pls 131-164. Harxheim: Conchbooks.

External links
 

Rostellariidae
Gastropods described in 1842